The Women's South American Club Championship is an annual roller hockey club competition organized by CSP (South American Roller Confederation) with the most successful women's teams of South America.

Winners

Wins by team

Wins by country

References

Roller hockey competitions
Women's roller hockey